Ælfwald (also Alfwald or Aelfwald or Elfwald) may refer to:

 King Ælfwald I of Northumbria (died 788)
 King Ælfwald II of Northumbria 
 King Ælfwald of Sussex
 King Ælfwald of East Anglia (died 749)
 Ælfwold I (bishop of Crediton) (died 972)
 Ælfwold II (bishop of Crediton) (died before the period between 1011 and 1015)
 Ælfwold III (bishop of Crediton) (died between 1011 and 1015)
 Ælfwold I (Bishop of Sherborne) (died 978)
 Ælfwold II (Bishop of Sherborne) (died 1058)

Old English given names
Masculine given names